The 2019 MBC Entertainment Awards presented by Munhwa Broadcasting Corporation (MBC), took place on December 29, 2019 at MBC Public Hall in Sangam-dong, Mapo-gu, Seoul. It was hosted by Jun Hyun-moo, Hwasa and P.O.

Nominations and winners

Presenters

Special performances

References

External links 

MBC TV original programming
MBC Entertainment Awards
2019 television awards
2019 in South Korea